In number theory, Hurwitz's theorem, named after Adolf Hurwitz, gives a bound on a Diophantine approximation. The theorem states that for every irrational number ξ there are infinitely many relatively prime integers m, n such that

The condition that ξ is irrational cannot be omitted. Moreover the constant  is the best possible; if we replace  by any number  and we let  (the golden ratio) then there exist only finitely many relatively prime integers m, n such that the formula above holds.

References 
 
 
 
 

Diophantine approximation
Theorems in number theory